The SSP (Submarine Scout Pusher) were a class of Royal Navy non-rigid airship or "blimp" developed by the United Kingdom during World War I as a successor to the earlier SS class airship. Found to be inferior to a parallel development, the Submarine Scout Zero non-rigid, only a few were built.
The main role of these craft was to escort convoys and scout or search for German U-boats.

Design and development
In 1916, design commenced at RNAS Kingsnorth on an SS class -type airship that would have a more comfortable purpose-built car, and not simply be an adaptation of an aeroplane fuselage. The SSP cars were of rectangular cross-section, had a blunt nose, and could accommodate a crew of three.

As the name suggests, the SSP was powered by a  Green engine mounted on bearers to the rear of the car, powering a  diameter four-bladed propeller in pusher configuration. Four examples of the type were later fitted with  Rolls-Royce Hawk engines.

Six SSPs entered service between January and June 1917, but because of the success of the SSZ type it was decided that these would become the standard SS variant, and the SSP programme was terminated.

Operators

Specifications

See also

References
Notes

Bibliography

External links
 SS-class airships on the Airship Heritage Trust website
 SSP-class airship specifications and logs on the Airship Heritage Trust website

Airships of the United Kingdom
1910s British patrol aircraft
Aircraft first flown in 1917